Illyrian may refer to:

Illyria, the historical region on the Balkan Peninsula
Illyrians, an ancient tribe inhabiting Illyria
Illyrian languages, languages of ancient Illyrian tribes
 Illyrian (South Slavic), a common name for 17th to 19th century South Slavic languages, the forerunner of Serbo-Croatian
Illyrian movement, cultural movement in 19th century Croatia
Illyricum (Roman province)
Illyrian Provinces, province of the First French Empire
Kingdom of Illyria (1816–49), crown land of Austria
 HD 82886, a star officially named Illyrian in Leo Minor

Arts and entertainment 

Illyrians, a fictional race of humanoids, including the character Una Chin-Riley, in the Star Trek franchise

See also
 Illyria (disambiguation)
 Illyrians (disambiguation)
 Illyricum (disambiguation)
 Illyricus (disambiguation) 
 Illyrian dog (disambiguation) 

Language and nationality disambiguation pages